Jangir Maddadi (born 1979 in Kurdistan), is an industrial designer living in Kalmar, Sweden and the owner of Jangir Maddadi Design Bureau. In 2010, he was awarded the Årets Nybyggare prize by King Carl XVI Gustaf of Sweden for his outstanding entrepreneurial work as an adopted citizen of Sweden.

Maddadi's product lines of contemporary style luxury benches, flowerpots, waste bins, and lamps are primarily geared towards commercial development properties. Products from his first collection, the Union Family, have been sold to clients such as Robert F. and Mary Richardson Kennedy, and to Columbia Pictures for their set of Men in Black 3.

Early life
Maddadi was born in Kurdistan where he lived until he was 13 years old, when the Iran–Iraq War forced him and his family to flee from a refugee camp to Sweden and settle in Kalmar. He attended and graduated from the Linnaeus University School of Design in Pukeberg, Sweden in 2004 and began his company in 2008.

Awards
Maddadi is the recipient of the 2010 Årets Nybyggare prize in Sweden.

References

External links

Living people
Swedish people of Kurdish descent
Swedish industrial designers
1979 births